, also known by the mononym , is a superhero and one of the main protagonists of the manga series My Hero Academia, created by Kōhei Horikoshi. Being the only child who inherited both Endeavor and Rei's Quirks, Shoto was often separated from his siblings. After witnessing how Endeavor abused his mother, Shoto began to despise Endeavor and refused to use his fire powers as a result, though he began to use them more after a fight with Izuku Midoriya.

However, there are drawbacks to either side's overuse. Shoto has received positive reception by critics, with many praising his character development and origins in the anime.

Creation and conception
Shoto was the fourth student in class 1-A to be created by Horikoshi, following Izuku Midoriya, Katsuki Bakugo, and Ochaco Uraraka. Originally Horikoshi had intended the UA Sports Festival solely to develop Shoto's character, though later had to expand it to give more characters a chance to be in the spotlight.

Appearances

In My Hero Academia
Shoto is the youngest of four siblings from Endeavor (Enji Todoroki) and Rei Todoroki. However, unlike his siblings, Shoto was the only one who inherited both Endeavor and Rei's quirks, which was Endeavor's goal with the marriage, as he wanted a successor who could defeat All Might. While Shoto was a child, his mother poured boiling hot water on the  right side of his face, creating the scar seen on the right of his face. During this time, Endeavor often abused his mother Rei, which negatively effected both Shoto's mental health and his feelings towards his father. Due to this distaste for his father, he refused to use the fire portion of his quirk. After his fight against Izuku Midoriya in the U.A. Sports Festival, Shoto began to be more accepting of his fire powers. Shoto also became more sociable as a result. 

Shoto's Quirk is Half-Cold Half-Hot, which allows him to freeze things with the right side of his body and shoot flames from the left side of his body. After overcoming the reluctance to use his flame powers, he learns different ways to combine both powers effectively. However, overuse of his powers could cause him to suffer from frostbite or heat stroke.

In the series' anime adaptation, Shoto is voiced by Yuki Kaji in Japanese and David Matranga in English. In the stage play, he is portrayed by Ryō Kitamura.

Other media
Shoto was added to the crossover video game Jump Force as a DLC character on May 26, 2020. In a crossover promotion with Avengers: Infinity War, Shoto shared a brief conversation with Thor.

Reception

Popularity
Shoto has consistently ranked in the top three in popularity polls for the series alongside Izuku Midoriya and Katsuki Bakugo. In Tumblr's top anime and manga characters of 2020, Shoto ranked seventh. Anime! Anime! did a poll where the readers voted for the most popular hero characters. Shoto ranked as the sixth-most popular hero character in 2021; and eleventh in 2023. At the 2nd Crunchyroll Anime Awards, Shoto won the award for best boy.

Critical response

Alex Osborn from IGN praised Shoto and his origins as emotional. Daniel Kurland from Den of Geek also offered some praise, stating that Shoto was one of the coolest characters of the series. The Anime UK News reviewer praised the character, as well as his voice actor in both the original Japanese and English dubbed versions. Princess Weekes and Briana Lawrence of The Mary Sue also offered praise for Shoto, specifically for his character development and personality. Brittney Hemmands of Comic Book Resources felt that Shoto became less likeable as the series progressed. Götz Piesbergen from Splash Comics praised the character as unique and enjoyable. Mickaël Géreaume from Planete BD praised Shoto as an endearing character. Columnists from Manga News praised the character development and origin story of Shoto.

Naruto creator Masashi Kishimoto praised the character.

References

Child superheroes
Comics characters introduced in 2014
Crunchyroll Anime Awards winners
Fictional characters with disfigurements
Fictional characters with post-traumatic stress disorder
Fictional characters with fire or heat abilities
Fictional characters with heterochromia
Fictional characters with ice or cold abilities
Fictional characters with superhuman durability or invulnerability
Fictional Japanese people in anime and manga
Fighting game characters
Japanese superheroes
Male characters in anime and manga
Male superheroes
My Hero Academia
Superheroes in anime and manga
Teenage characters in anime and manga
Teenage characters in television
Teenage superheroes
Superhero school students